Soulsville is the eighth studio album by English singer-songwriter Beverley Knight. The album was released on 10 June 2016. The album features a number of classic soul covers and Knight-penned tracks.

Track listing 
The full track listing was confirmed by iTunes.

Charts

References 

2016 albums
Beverley Knight albums
Albums produced by Justin Stanley
East West Records albums